Robson Donato Conceição (born 25 October 1988) is a Brazilian professional boxer. He is a two-time super featherweight world title challenger, having challenged for the WBC title in 2021, and the unified WBC, WBO and The Ring titles in 2022. As an amateur he became the first Brazilian boxer to win an Olympic gold medal at the 2016 Olympics.

Amateur career
Born in Salvador, capital of the Brazilian state of Bahia, Conceição started boxing at the age of 13 to stand his own in street fights. He had to walk 9 kilometers to his academy due to not having money for bus tickets, woke up early in the morning to help his grandmother who sold groceries, and helped his family by selling ice cream and being a kitchen helper. His first coach was Luiz Dórea, who also managed world champion Acelino Freitas, Olympic medallist Adriana Araújo, and MMA fighter Junior dos Santos.

Just four months after entering the Brazilian boxing team, Conceição fought the qualifiers for the 2008 Summer Olympics in Beijing. While he fell in the first American qualifier to Idel Torriente, Conceição won all fights to get an Olympic spot. He eventually lost his opening match to Li Yang.

After losing in the first round of the 2009 World Amateur Boxing Championships, in 2011 Conceição won two bouts before a close decision 18:19 to the eventual winner Vasyl Lomachenko. That same year he got a silver medal at the 2011 Pan American Games, losing the final to eventual Olympic medalist Yasniel Toledo and guaranteeing a second Olympic spot.  During the Pan Ams, Conceição proposed to his girlfriend, fellow boxer Érica Matos, whom he married in 2013. The following year the couple had a daughter, Sophia.

The 2012 Summer Olympics in London had Conceição again losing his first match. Hoping to take part in the 2016 Summer Olympics that would be hosted in Brazil, Conceição did not turn professional, instead signing with the Brazilian Navy to gain the scholarship and training facilities reserved for military sportspeople. Conceição won a silver and a bronze medal at the 2013 and 2015 tournaments, the latter guaranteeing him the Olympic spot. Before the Olympics, in 2015 Pan American Championships in Vargas, Venezuela, he won the gold medal after beating Cuban Lázaro Álvarez in the final, in the quarterfinals (his first fight) he won a 3–0 decision against Lindolfo Delgado of Mexico; in the semifinals he won a 3–0 decision against Luis Angel Cabrera of Venezuela; in the finals he won a 3–0 decision against Lázaro Álvarez of Cuba. Come the tournament in Rio de Janeiro, Conceição won four uncontested fights, including over three-times world champion Lázaro Álvarez and European silver medallist Sofiane Oumiha, to become the first Brazilian boxer to win an Olympic gold medal.

After the 2016 Olympics, Conceição signed a professional promotion contract with Top Rank. He finished his amateur career with a record of 405–15.

Professional career 
Conceição's professional debut happened on November 5, 2016 in Las Vegas, as one of the undercards in the Manny Pacquiao vs. Jessie Vargas event. He won the fight by unanimous decision, with two scorecards of 60–54 and one scorecard of 60–53. Conceição next faced Aaron Ely on January 27, 2017. He won the fight by a second-round knockout, the first stoppage victory of his career. Conceição was then booked to face the over-matched Aaron Hollis on March 17, 2017. He once again won by a second-round knockout. Conceição had his first minor step-up in competition on July 21, 2017, when he faced Bernardo Gomez Uribe. He needed only 53 seconds to stop the Mexican. Conceição was booked to face Carlos Osorio on September 22, 2017, in his final fight of the year. Osorio retired from the fight at the end of the third round.

Conceição began his 2018 campaign by facing he undefeated prospect Ignacio Holguin on February 16, 2018. He won the fight by unanimous decision, with scores of 60–52, 60–52 and 60–54. Conceição  next faced Alex Torres Rynn on April 28, 2018. He won the fight by unanimous decision, with all three judges scoring the fight 60–54 in his favor. Conceição faced Gavino Guaman on June 30, 2018, in his eight professional appearance. He won the fight by a third-round technical knockout. Conceição was then scheduled to face Edgar Cantu on August 25, 2018. He won the fight by unanimous decision, with all three judges awarding Conceição an 80–71 scorecard. Conceição faced Joey Laviolette on November 4, 2018, in his final fight of the year. He won the fight by unanimous decision, with all three judges scoring the fight 80–72 for the Brazilian.

Conceição fought thrice in 2019, with all three fights coming against journeymen opponents. On January 18, Conceição beat Hector Ambriz Suarez by a unanimous decision after eight rounds. Two months later, on March 31, 2019, Conceição stopped Sergio Ariel Estrela at the 1:54 minute mark of the first round. Conceição finished the year with a unanimous decision victory against Carlos Ruiz on June 8, 2019. Conceição was booked to face Eduardo Pereira dos Reis on August 29, 2020, following a 14-month absence from the sport. He won the fight by a second-round technical knockout. Conceição next faced Luis Coria on October 31, 2020. The fight was scheduled for the undercard of the Naoya Inoue-Jason Moloney super-flyweight title clash. He won the fight by unanimous decision, with scores of 94–93, 95–92 and 95–92.

Conceição challenged the newly-minted WBC super featherweight champion Óscar Valdez on September 10, 2021, at the Casino Del Sol in Tucson, Arizona, United States. On August 31, it was revealed that Valdez had tested positive for the banned stimulant phentermine. On September 2, his B-sample tested positive as well. The fight with Conceição would still happen however, as the Pascua Yaqui Tribe Athletic Commission went by WADA guidelines, which only prohibit stimulants in-competition. Valdez won the fight by unanimous decision, with two judges awarding him a 115-112 scorecard, while the third judge scored it 117-110 for Valdez. Most media members scored the fight for Valdez.

On December 21, 2021, it was revealed that Conceição would face the unbeaten Xavier Martinez in a WBC super-featherweight title eliminator. The fight was scheduled as the main event of a January 29, 2022 Top Rank card, and was broadcast by ESPN and ESPN Deportes. He won the fight by unanimous decision, with scores of 98–92, 99–91 and 100–90. Conceição dominated the bout, with Martinez's sole moment of success coming at the end of the third round, when he briefly staggered Conceição.

Conceição was booked to face the unified WBC, WBO, and The Ring super featherweight champion Shakur Stevenson in the main event of an ESPN broadcast card, which took place on September 23, 2022, at the Prudential Center in Newark, New Jersey. He entered the fight as a heavy betting underdog, with most bookmakers having at -1800 odds. Stevenson missed weight by 1.6 lbs at the official weigh-ins and was stripped of his titles. In front of an audience of 10,107, Conceição lost the fight by unanimous decision, with two scorecards of 117–109 and one scorecard of 118–108.

Professional boxing record

References

External links

 
 
 

Living people
Sportspeople from Salvador, Bahia
Featherweight boxers
Super-featherweight boxers
Lightweight boxers
Boxers at the 2008 Summer Olympics
Boxers at the 2012 Summer Olympics
Boxers at the 2016 Summer Olympics
Boxers at the 2011 Pan American Games
Olympic boxers of Brazil
1988 births
Brazilian male boxers
AIBA World Boxing Championships medalists
Pan American Games silver medalists for Brazil
Olympic gold medalists for Brazil
Olympic medalists in boxing
Medalists at the 2016 Summer Olympics
Pan American Games medalists in boxing
Medalists at the 2011 Pan American Games